José Cusí (born 12 January 1934) is a Spanish former sports shooter. He competed in the trap event at the 1968 Summer Olympics.

References

1934 births
Living people
Spanish male sport shooters
Olympic shooters of Spain
Shooters at the 1968 Summer Olympics
Sportspeople from Barcelona